Master of Play (心戰) is a 2012 Hong Kong psychological crime thriller produced by TVB. It stars veteran actor Adam Cheng and internationally acclaimed 2007 TVB Anniversary Awards Best Actor Moses Chan in the lead role, portraying characters playing a cat-and-mouse game of deceit, suspense and intrigue.

Synopsis
Kan Siu-Nam (Adam Cheng), due to the loss of his daughter Tansy, divorces his wife, Angela (Rebecca Chan). He whole-heartedly focuses on his acting career since then, still clinging on to the belief that his daughter was still alive. Due to a role in which he plays a murderer, he becomes embroiled into a serial killer case. Through his acquaintance Esther (Maggie Shiu), he meets renowned magician Ivan (Moses Chan) and his sister Natalie (Aimee Chan). As a spate of serial killings hits Hong Kong, Kan suspects that Ivan is related to the incidents. Pitting his wits against Ivan's schemes, Kan seeks to reveal the truth behind the killings, and discover the truth behind his daughter's disappearance.

Plot summary
Kan Siu-Nam (Adam Cheng) is a stage actor whose daughter, Tansy, was wrongly kidnapped more than 20 years ago. Refusing to accept it as a fact, he clings on to the belief that she is still alive. When called upon to play the role of a convicted murderer who insists he is wronged, Kan discovers that he can use his skills to replicate the subject's psyche in his own mind and take on other people's persona within himself.

Ivan Cheung Sai-yin (Moses Chan) is a stage magician who has a dark past of his own, being involved in the kidnapping of Siu-Nam's daughter Tansy. Ever since his father disappeared when he was a child, he has been living a new life with his sister Natalie (Aimee Chan). When an old acquaintance from his past reappears, threatening to unravel his present life, he has no choice but to kill him. However, killing him triggers Ivan's dissociative identity disorder, unlocking his other personalities: Eric, the personification of his evilness; Michelle, the personification of his lust and envy; Edwin, the personification of his pride and cunningness; and Martin, the personification of his wrath and temper. These 4 personalities influence him to kill more and more people, in order to keep his past a secret.

As fate would have it, Siu-Nam and Ivan eventually cross paths despite the latter's attempt to avoid him. When a streak of serial killings hit Hong Kong, the police seek Siu-Nam's assistance in the investigations. As Siu-Nam digs deeper, he realizes that Ivan is more complicated than he appears to be, and that Ivan was related to his daughter's kidnap. In order to find out the truth, Siu-Nam replicates Ivan's psyche in his own mind, unwittingly taking on Ivan's 4 other personas as well.

Getting too deep into Ivan's psyche, with the other personalities dominating him, Siu-Nam starts to lose his grip on reality, becoming every bit as dangerous as Ivan. Can he unravel the truth before he is consumed by madness? Who will win in this battle of wits and emerge as the Master of Play?

Cast

Kan family

Chiang family

Chan family

Jekyll bar (Ivan's Personality)

Viewership ratings
The following is a table that includes a list of the total ratings points based on television viewership.

References

TVB dramas
Hong Kong crime television series
Psychological thriller television series
2012 Hong Kong television series debuts
2012 Hong Kong television series endings